Zulueta is a Basque and Spanish surname. Notable people with the surname include:

Dawn Zulueta (born 1969), Filipina film and television actress
Eduardo de Zulueta y Dato (born 1923), Spanish diplomat
Elisa Zulueta (born 1981), Chilean television, theatre and film actress
Ernesto de Zulueta e Isasi (1892–1969), Spanish diplomat
Ernesto de Zulueta y Samá (1855–1919), Spanish politician
Francis de Zulueta (1878–1958), professor of Civil Law at Oxford
Francisco Moreno Zulueta (1880–1963), Spanish lawyer and politician
Ivan Zulueta (1943–2009), Spanish designer and film director
José Zulueta (1889–1972), Philippine lawyer and politician who was elected as Senate President
Julián de Zulueta, 1st Marquis of Álava (1814–1878), Spanish politician of Basque descent
Leo Zulueta (born 1952), American tattoo artist
Leyén Zulueta (born 1979), Cuban judoka
Sir Philip de Zulueta (1925–1989), British diplomat and businessman
Pinggot Zulueta (born 1961), Filipino visual artist and photojournalist
R. Zulueta da Costa (1915–1990), Filipino poet
Ricardo Estanislao Zulueta, Cuban-born artist and scholar

Places
Zulueta, Navarre, village in Navarre, Spain
Zulueta (Remedios), village in Villa Clara province, Cuba

See also
 Étienne de Silhouette or de Zulueta (1709–1767), French Controller-General of Finances